Bernd Cullmann (born 11 October 1939) is a retired West German sprinter who won a gold medal in 4×100 m relay at the 1960 Summer Olympics. The German team finished second behind the American team, equaling its own world record of 39.5, but the Americans were later disqualified for an incorrect exchange.

Cullmann was gem cutter by profession and a national champion in the 50 m indoor in 1960, and in the 60 m indoor in 1961. He was part of the German relay teams that set two world records. His brother Hans was a middle distance runner.

References

1939 births
Living people
People from Birkenfeld (district)
Sportspeople from Rhineland-Palatinate
West German male sprinters
Athletes (track and field) at the 1960 Summer Olympics
Olympic athletes of the United Team of Germany
Olympic gold medalists for the United Team of Germany

People from the Rhine Province
Medalists at the 1960 Summer Olympics
Olympic gold medalists in athletics (track and field)